"Red Star Shines" is a Chinese patriotic song depicting the revolutionary war against the Kuomintang by the Chinese Communist Party.  The song is the theme song of the 1974 red classic movie Shining Red Star.

Lyrics 

Chinese patriotic songs
Maoist China propaganda songs